Basse may refer to:

Places
 Basse (Gambia), The Gambia
 Basse Santa Su, The Gambia
 Basse, Netherlands
 Bassé, Burkina Faso

People
 Éliane Basse (1899–1985), French paleontologist
 Hans-Dieter von Basse (1916–1945), Oberstleutnant in the Wehrmacht during World War II
 Jeremiah Basse (died 1725), governor of West and East Jersey
 Marie Senghor Basse (1930-2019), Senegalese physician
 Maurits Basse (1868–1944), Belgian writer and teacher
 Mikkel Basse (born 1996), Danish footballer
 William Basse (c.1583–1653?), English poet
 Willie Basse (1956–2018), American hard rock musician

Other uses
 Basse (game), a Norwegian bag ball game
 Basse und Selve, German engine manufacturers
 Rue Basse, a road in the 1st arrondissement of Paris, France

See also 
 
 Bass (disambiguation)
 Base (disambiguation)